This is a list of men's Swedish Short Course Swimming Championships champions.

Current program

50m freestyle

1953 – Göran Larsson, Stockholms KK
1954 – Göran Larsson, Stockholms KK
1955 – Göran Larsson, Simavdelningen 1902
1956 – Göran Larsson, Simavdelningen 1902
1957 – Göran Larsson, Simavdelningen 1902
1986 – Niels Liedberg, Karlstads SS
1987 – Göran Titus, Örebro SA
1988 – Per Johansson, Borlänge SS
1989 – Joakim Holmqvist, Jönköpings SS
1990 – Lars-Ove Jansson, Upsala SS
1991 – Lars-Ove Jansson, Upsala SS
1992 – Joakim Holmqvist, Jönköpings SS
1993 – Joakim Holmqvist, Jönköpings SS
1994 – Joakim Holmquist, Jönköpings SS
1995 – Fredrik Letzler, Spårvägens SF
1996 – Joakim Holmqvist, Jönköpings SS
1997 – Jonas Åkesson, Spårvägens SF
1998 – John Miranda, Stockholms KK
1999 – John Miranda, Södertälje SS
2000 – John Miranda, Södertälje SS
2001 – Stefan Nystrand, Södertörns SS
2002 – Stefan Nystrand, Södertörns SS
2003 – Stefan Nystrand, Södertörns SS
2004 – Stefan Nystrand, Södertörns SS
2005 – Marcus Piehl, Linköpings ASS
2006 – Stefan Nystrand, SK Neptun
2007 – Petter Stymne, SK Neptun

100m freestyle

1972 – Gunnar Larsson, Malmö SS
1973 – Gunnar Larsson, Malmö SS
1974 – Bernt Zarnowiecki, Falu SS
1975 – Bernt Zarnowiecki, Falu SS
1976 – Dan Larsson, Sundsvalls SS
1977 – Dan Larsson, Sundsvalls SS
1978 – Dan Larsson, Sundsvalls SS
1979 – Per Holmertz, Motala SS
1980 – Per Wikström, Borlänge SS
1981 – Per Holmertz, Stockholmspolisens IF
1982 – Per Holmertz, Stockholmspolisens IF
1983 – Per Holmertz, Stockholmspolisens IF
1984 – Thomas Lejdström, Västerås SS
1985 – Tommy Werner, Karlskrona SS
1986 – Tommy Werner, Karlskrona SS
1987 – Tommy Werner, Karlskrona SS
1988 – Tommy Werner, Karlskrona SS
1989 – Tommy Werner, Karlskrona SS
1990 – Tommy Werner, Karlskrona SS
1991 – Joakim Holmqvist, Jönköpings SS
1992 – Tommy Werner, Karlskrona SS
1993 – Anders Holmertz, Spårvägens SF
1994 – Anders Holmertz, Spårvägens SF
1995 – Fredrik Letzler, Spårvägens SF
1996 – Anders Holmertz, Spårvägens SF
1997 – Anders Holmertz, Spårvägens SF
1998 – Johan Wallberg, SK Neptun
1999 – Lars Frölander, Sundsvalls SS
2000 – Lars Frölander, Sundsvalls SS
2001 – Stefan Nystrand, Södertörns SS
2002 – Lars Frölander, Linköpings ASS
2003 – Stefan Nystrand, Södertörns SS
2004 – Stefan Nystrand, Södertörns SS
2005 – Marcus Piehl, Linköpings ASS
2006 – Jonas Tilly, Trelleborgs SS
2007 – Petter Stymne, SK Neptun

200m freestyle

1959 – Bengt Nordvall, SK Neptun
1960 – Bengt Nordvall, SK Neptun
1961 – Lars-Erik Bengtsson, SK Neptun
1962 – Mats Svensson, IF Elfsborg
1963 – Jan Lundin, Stockholmspolisens IF
1964 – Jan Lundin, Stockholmspolisens IF
1965 – Jan Lundin, Stockholmspolisens IF
1966 – Lester Eriksson, SK Neptun
1967 – Lester Eriksson, SK Neptun
1968 – Lester Eriksson, SK Neptun
1969 – Gunnar Larsson, Malmö SS
1970 – Göran Jansson, Stockholmspolisens IF
1971 – Hans Ljungberg, Timrå SK
1976 – Dan Larsson, Sundsvalls SS
1977 – Pär Arvidsson, Finspångs SK
1978 – Gary Andersson, Kristianstads SLS
1979 – Per Holmertz, Motala SS
1980 – Thomas Lejdström, Västerås SS
1981 – Per Holmertz, Stockholmspolisens IF
1982 – Per Holmertz, Stockholmspolisens IF
1983 – Thomas Lejdström, Västerås SS
1984 – Michael Söderlund, Karlskrona SS
1985 – Tommy Werner, Karlskrona SS
1986 – Tommy Werner, Karlskrona SS
1987 – Tommy Werner, Karlskrona SS
1988 – Anders Holmertz, Motala SS
1989 – Anders Holmertz, Motala SS
1990 – Anders Holmertz, Motala SS
1991 – Anders Holmertz, Spårvägens SF
1992 – Anders Holmertz, Spårvägens SF
1993 – Anders Holmertz, Spårvägens SF
1994 – Anders Holmertz, Spårvägens SF
1995 – Anders Holmertz, Spårvägens SF
1996 – Anders Holmertz, Spårvägens SF
1997 – Anders Lyrbring, Simavdelningen 1902
1998 – Johan Wallberg, SK Neptun
1999 – Anders Lyrbring, Mölndals ASS
2000 – Johan Wallberg, SK Neptun
2001 – Erik Pönni, Jönköpings SS
2002 – Jesper Levander, Södertörns SS
2003 – Lars Frölander, Linköpings ASS
2004 – Mattias Ohlin, Trelleborgs SS
2005 – Erik Andersson, Göteborg Sim
2006 – Jonas Persson, Malmö KK
2007 – Christoffer Wikström, Upsala SS

400m freestyle

1972 – Gunnar Larsson, Malmö SS
1973 – Anders Bellbring, Limhamns SS
1974 – Bengt Gingsjö, Simavdelningen 1902
1975 – Peter Pettersson, SK Laxen
1976 – Peter Pettersson, SK Laxen
1977 – Gary Andersson, Kristianstads SLS
1978 – Gary Andersson, Kristianstads SLS
1979 – Thomas Lejdström, Västerås SS
1980 – Thomas Lejdström, Västerås SS
1981 – Thomas Lejdström, Västerås SS
1982 – Thomas Lejdström, Västerås SS
1983 – Thomas Lejdström, Västerås SS
1995 – Anders Holmertz, Spårvägens SF
1984 – Anders Holmertz, Motala SS
1985 – Anders Holmertz, Motala SS
1986 – Anders Holmertz, Motala SS
1987 – Anders Holmertz, Motala SS
1988 – Anders Holmertz, Motala SS
1989 – Anders Holmertz, Motala SS
1990 – Anders Holmertz, Motala SS
1991 – Anders Holmertz, Spårvägens SF
1992 – Anders Holmertz, Spårvägens SF
1993 – Anders Holmertz, Spårvägens SF
1994 – Anders Holmertz, Spårvägens SF
1996 – Anders Holmertz, Spårvägens SF
1997 – Anders Holmertz, Spårvägens SF
1998 – Jonas Lundström, Sundsvalls SS
1999 – Petter Lindh, Jönköpings SS
2000 – Mikael E. Rosén, Sundsvalls SS
2001 – Erik Pönni, Jönköpings SS
2002 – Jesper Levander, Södertörns SS
2003 – Peter Edvardsson, SK Neptun
2004 – Peter Edvardsson, SK Neptun
2005 – Peter Edvardsson, SK Neptun
2006 – Johan Claar, Jönköpings SS
2007 – Johan Claar, Jönköpings SS

1500m freestyle

1972 – Anders Bellbring, Upsala SS
1973 – Anders Bellbring, Limhamns SS
1974 – Bengt Gingsjö, Simavdelningen 1902
1975 – Peter Pettersson, SK Laxen
1976 – Gary Andersson, Norrköpings KK
1977 – Gary Andersson, Kristianstads SLS
1978 – Gary Andersson, Kristianstads SLS
1979 – Magnus Petersson, Jönköpings SS
1980 – Thomas Lejdström, Västerås SS
1981 – Karl-Erik Elias, Linköpings ASS
1982 – Thomas Lejdström, Västerås SS
1983 – Thomas Lejdström, Västerås SS
1984 – Anders Holmertz, Motala SS
1985 – Anders Holmertz, Motala SS
1986 – Stefan Persson, Malmö KK
1987 – Stefan Persson, Malmö KK
1988 – Henrik Jangwall, Malmö KK
1989 – Henrik Jangwall, Malmö KK
1990 – Björn Möller, Malmö KK
1991 – Björn Möller, Malmö KK
1992 – Jonas Lundström, Södertälje SS
1993 – Jonas Lundström, Södertälje SS
1994 – Jonas Lundström, Södertälje SS
1995 – Jonas Lundström, Södertälje SS
1996 – Ola Strömberg, Upsala SS
1997 – Jonas Lundström, Sundsvalls SS
1998 – Jonas Lundström, Sundsvalls SS
1999 – Mathias Olshed, SK Sydsim
2000 – Mikael E. Rosén, Sundsvalls SS
2001 – Patrik Svensson, Malmö KK
2002 – Johan Claar, Jönköpings SS
2003 – Johan Claar, Jönköpings SS
2004 – Johan Claar, Jönköpings SS
2005 – Johan Claar, Jönköpings SS
2006 – Johan Claar, Jönköpings SS
2007 – Johan Claar, Jönköpings SS

50m backstroke

1990 – Göran Sköld, Södertörns SS
1991 – Rudi Dollmayer, SK Ran
1992 – Rudi Dollmayer, SK Ran
1993 – Zsolt Hegmegi, Jönköpings SS
1994 – Zsolt Hegmegi, Jönköpings SS
1995 – Daniel Lönnberg, Växjö SS
1996 – Zsolt Hegmegi, Jönköpings SS
1997 – Daniel Carlsson, Väsby SS
1998 – Daniel Carlsson, Väsby SS
1999 – Daniel Carlsson, Väsby SS
2000 – Daniel Carlsson, Väsby SS
2001 – Daniel Lönnberg, Sundsvalls SS
2002 – Daniel Lönnberg, Sundsvalls SS
2003 – Mattias Ohlin, Trelleborgs SS
2004 – Peter Segerlund, Stockholms KK
2005 – Jens Petersson, Stockholms KK
2006 – Per Nylin, Norrköpings KK
2007 – Per Nylin, Norrköpings KK

100m backstroke

1961 – Bengt-Olov Almstedt, Örebro SS
1962 – Bengt-Olov Almstedt, Örebro SS
1963 – Leif Sjöblom, SK Neptun
1964 – Leif Sjöblom, SK Neptun
1965 – Hans Ljungberg, SK Neptun
1976 – Svante Zetterlund, Karlskoga SS
1977 – Mikael Brandén, Stockholmspolisens IF
1978 – Jan Thorell, Stockholmspolisens IF
1979 – Bengt Baron, Finspångs SK
1980 – Bengt Baron, SK Korrugal
1981 – Bengt Baron, SK Korrugal
1982 – Bengt Baron, SK Korrugal
1983 – Bengt Baron, SK Korrugal
1984 – Bengt Baron, SK Korrugal
1985 – Rudi Dollmayer, Karlskoga SS
1986 – Hans Fredin, Södertörns SS
1987 – Hans Fredin, Södertörns SS
1988 – Niklas Håkansson, Stockholmspolisens IF
1989 – Hans Fredin, Södertörns SS
1990 – Niklas Håkansson, Stockholmspolisens IF
1991 – Niklas Håkansson, Stockholmspolisens IF
1992 – Rudi Dollmayer, SK Ran
1993 – Zsolt Hegmegi, Jönköpings SS
1994 – Daniel Lönnberg, Karlskrona SS
1995 – Daniel Lönnberg, Växjö SS
1996 – Tobias Marklund, Sundsvalls SS
1997 – Daniel Carlsson, Väsby SS and Daniel Lönnberg, Växjö SS
1998 – Daniel Carlsson, Väsby SS
1999 – Daniel Carlsson, Väsby SS
2000 – Mattias Ohlin, Trelleborgs SS
2001 – Daniel Lönnberg, Sundsvalls SS
2002 – Daniel Lönnberg, Sundsvalls SS
2003 – Mattias Ohlin, Trelleborgs SS
2004 – Peter Segerlund, Stockholms KK
2005 – Jens Petersson, Stockholms KK
2006 – Simon Sjödin, Södertörns SS
2007 – Jens Petersson, Stockholms KK

200m backstroke

1953 – Hans Andersson, Tunafors SK
1954 – Göran Larsson, Stockholms KK
1955 – Göran Larsson, Simavdelningen 1902
1956 – Hans Andersson, Tunafors SK
1957 – Hans Andersson, Tunafors SK
1958 – Lars Eriksson, SoIK Hellas
1959 – Bengt-Olof Almstedt, Örebro SS
1960 – Lars Eriksson, Malmö SS
1965 – Hans Ljungberg, SK Neptun
1966 – Hans Ljungberg, Bromma SS
1967 – Olle Ferm, Norrköpings KK
1968 – Hans Ljungberg, Bromma SS
1969 – Gunnar Larsson, Malmö SS
1970 – Bengt Gingsjö, Simavdelningen 1902
1971 – Svante Zetterlund, Karlskoga SS
1972 – Anders Sandberg, Eskilstuna SS
1973 – Gunnar Larsson, Malmö SS
1974 – Leif Ericsson, Upsala SS
1975 – Leif Ericsson, Upsala SS
1976 – Bengt Svensson, Upsala SS
1977 – Jan Thorell, Stockholmspolisens IF
1978 – Jan Thorell, Stockholmspolisens IF
1979 – Jan Thorell, Stockholmspolisens IF
1980 – Bengt Baron, SK Korrugal
1981 – Bengt Baron, SK Korrugal
1982 – Hans Fredin, Södertörns SS
1983 – Bengt Baron, SK Korrugal
1984 – Bengt Baron, SK Korrugal
1985 – Michael Söderlund, Karlskrona SS
1986 – Hans Fredin, Södertörns SS
1987 – Hans Fredin, Södertörns SS
1988 – Per-Åke Brink, Jönköpings SS
1989 – Hans Fredin, Södertörns SS
1990 – Niklas Håkansson, Stockholmspolisens IF
1991 – Martin Svensson, Jönköpings SS
1992 – Daniel Lönnberg, Karlskrona SS
1993 – Tobias Marklund, Piteå Sim
1994 – Tobias Marklund, Piteå Sim
1995 – Pär Gustafsson, Ängelholms SS
1996 – Tobias Marklund, Sundsvalls SS
1997 – Tobias Marklund, Sundsvalls SS
1998 – Tobias Marklund, Spårvägens SF
1999 – Joakim Olsson, Södertörns SS
2000 – Mattias Ohlin, Trelleborgs SS
2001 – Erik Pönni, Jönköpings SS
2002 – Jens Pettersson, Stockholms KK
2003 – Mattias Ohlin, Trelleborgs SS
2004 – Pontus Renholm, Stockholmspolisens IF
2006 – Konstantin Sundin, Spårvägens SF
2007 – Simon Sjödin, SK Neptun

50m breaststroke

1990 – Anders Stensson, Upsala SS
1991 – Jan Stensson, Upsala SS
1992 – Patrik Isaksson, Västerås SS
1993 – Patrik Robertsson, Södertälje SS
1994 – Patrik Robertsson, Södertälje SS
1995 – Patrik Robertsson, Södertälje SS
1996 – Jens Johansson, Sundsvalls SS
1997 – Patric Robertsson, Södertälje SS
1998 – Patrik Isaksson, Västerås SS
1999 – Christian Clausen, Trelleborgs SS
2000 – Martin Gustavsson, Malmö KK
2001 – Stefan Nystrand, Södertörns SS
2002 – Jens Johansson, Sundsvalls SS
2003 – Stefan Nystrand, Södertörns SS
2004 – Martin Gustavsson, Malmö KK
2005 – Jakob Dorch, Linköpings ASS
2006 – Per Nylin, Norrköpings KK
2007 – Per Nylin, Norrköpings KK

100m breaststroke

1954 – Lennart Brock, SK Poseidon
1955 – Rolf Junefelt, Jönköpings SLS
1956 – Rolf Junefelt, Jönköpings SLS
1957 – Bertil Liljeborg, SK Poseidon
1958 – Roland Lundin, SK Ran
1976 – Anders Norling, Stockholmspolisens IF
1977 – Anders Norling, Stockholmspolisens IF
1978 – Mikael Tredahl, Stockholmspolisens IF
1979 – Anders Norling, Stockholmspolisens IF
1980 – Peter Bergren, Skärets SS
1981 – Hans Bergqvist, Sundsvalls SS
1982 – Peter Bergren, Skärets SS
1983 – Peter Bergren, Skärets SS
1984 – Peter Bergren, Skärets SS
1985 – Peter Bergren, Skärets SS
1986 – Peter Bergren, Skärets SS
1987 – Peter Bergren, Skärets SS
1988 – Jan Stensson, Hagfors SS
1989 – Peter Bergren, Skärets SS
1990 – Jan Stensson, Upsala SS
1991 – Patrik Isaksson, Västerås SS
1992 – Peter Haraldsson, Södertälje SS
1993 – Magnus Classén, Norrköpings KK
1994 – Peter Karlsson, Västerås SS
1995 – Jens Johansson, Sundsvalls SS
1996 – Jens Johansson, Sundsvalls SS
1997 – Jens Johansson, Sundsvalls SS
1998 – Patrik Isaksson, Västerås SS
1999 – Patrik Isaksson, Västerås SS
2000 – Martin Gustavsson, Malmö KK
2001 – Patrik Isaksson, Västerås SS
2002 – Jens Johansson, Sundsvalls SS
2003 – Martin Gustavsson, Malmö KK
2004 – Martin Gustavsson, Malmö KK
2005 – Jakob Dorch, Linköpings ASS
2006 – Martin Gustavsson, Malmö KK
2007 – Christer Tour, SK Neptun

200m breaststroke

1959 – Tommie Lindström, Stockholmspolisens IF
1960 – Tommie Lindström, Stockholmspolisens IF
1961 – Tommie Lindström, Stockholmspolisens IF
1962 – Tommie Lindström, Stockholmspolisens IF
1963 – Roland Lundin, SK Ran
1964 – Björn Finnsson, Stockholmspolisens IF
1965 – Ulf Ericsson, Katrineholms SS
1966 – Tomas Johnsson, Skövde SS
1967 – Tomas Johnsson, Skövde SS
1968 – Tomas Johnsson, Skövde SS
1969 – Tomas Johnsson, Skövde SS
1970 – Tomas Johnsson, Skövde SS
1971 – Göran Eriksson, Göteborgs KK Najaden
1972 – Göran Eriksson, Göteborgs KK Najaden
1973 – Anders Häggqvist, Falu SS
1974 – Anders Norling, Stockholmspolisens IF
1975 – Anders Norling, Stockholmspolisens IF
1976 – Anders Norling, Stockholmspolisens IF
1977 – Anders Norling, Stockholmspolisens IF
1978 – Mikael Tredahl, Stockholmspolisens IF
1979 – Anders Norling, Stockholmspolisens IF
1980 – Peter Berggren, Skärets SS
1981 – Peter Berggren, Skärets SS
1982 – Peter Berggren, Skärets SS
1983 – Peter Berggren, Skärets SS
1984 – Peter Berggren, Skärets SS
1985 – Peter Berggren, Skärets SS
1986 – Peter Berggren, Skärets SS
1987 – Anders Petersson, Mariestads SS
1988 – Jan Bidrman, Malmö KK
1989 – Jan Bidrman, Malmö KK
1990 – Magnus Leth, SK Poseidon
1991 – Anders Stensson, Upsala SS
1992 – Mickael Alpfors, Malmö KK
1993 – Conny Wennberg, Turebergs IF
1994 – Fredrik Rosenholm, Spårvägens SF
1995 – Willy Ahlström, SK Neptun
1996 – Patrik Isaksson, Västerås SS
1997 – Peter Aronsson, Spårvägens SF
1998 – Patrik Isaksson, Västerås SS
1999 – Christian Clausen, Trelleborgs SS
2000 – Sverker Persson, Helsingborgs SS
2001 – Patrik Isaksson, Västerås SS
2002 – Martin Gustavsson, Malmö KK
2003 – Martin Gustavsson, Malmö KK
2004 – Martin Gustavsson, Malmö KK
2005 – Martin Gustavsson, Malmö KK
2006 – Martin Gustavsson, Malmö KK
2007 – Axel Pettersson, SK Neptun

50m butterfly

1990 – Jan Karlsson, Borlänge SS
1991 – Jan Karlsson, Borlänge SS
1992 – Jan Karlsson, Borlänge SS
1993 – Jonas Åkesson, Södertälje SS
1994 – Jonas Åkesson, Södertälje SS
1995 – Jonas Åkesson, Södertälje SS
1996 – Jonas Åkesson, Södertälje SS
1997 – Ola Fagerstrand, Malmö KK
1998 – Daniel Carlsson, Väsby SS
1999 – Daniel Carlsson, Väsby SS
2000 – Daniel Carlsson, Väsby SS
2001 – Tero Välimaa, SK Neptun
2002 – Lars Frölander, Linköpings ASS
2003 – Lars Frölander, Linköpings ASS
2004 – Tero Välimaa, Väsby SS
2005 – Marcus Piehl, Linköpings ASS
2006 – Lars Frölander, Linköpings ASS
2007 – Lars Frölander, Linköpings ASS

100m butterfly

1953 – Bo Larsson, SK Neptun
1954 – Bo Larsson, SK Neptun
1955 – Bo Larsson, SK Neptun
1956 – Bo Larsson, SK Neptun
1957 – Rolf Friberg, Jönköpings SLS
1958 – Peter Bergengren, Skellefteå SK
1959 – Rolf Friberg, Jönköpings SLS
1960 – Håkan Bengtsson, Stockholmspolisens IF
1961 – Håkan Bengtsson, Stockholmspolisens IF
1962 – Per Jernberg, Mariestads SS
1963 – Per Jernberg, Mariestads SS
1964 – Ingvar Eriksson, Sundsvalls SS
1965 – Ingvar Eriksson, Sundsvalls SS
1976 – Tommy Lindell, Stockholmspolisens IF
1977 – Pär Arvidsson, Finspångs SK
1978 – Tommy Lindell, Stockholmspolisens IF
1979 – Pär Arvidsson, Finspångs SK
1980 – Bengt Baron, SK Korrugal
1981 – Pär Arvidsson, SK Korrugal
1982 – Pär Arvidsson, SK Korrugal
1983 – Pär Arvidsson, SK Korrugal
1984 – Bengt Baron, SK Korrugal
1985 – Mikael Holmertz, Motala SS
1986 – Mikael Holmertz, Motala SS
1987 – Viktor Olsson, Helsingborgs SS
1988 – Anders Rasmusson, Helsingborgs SS
1989 – Christer Wallin, Mölndals ASS
1990 – Jan Bidrman, Malmö KK
1991 – Jonas Lögdberg, Täby Sim
1992 – Lars Frölander, Borlänge SS
1993 – Lars Frölander, Borlänge SS
1994 – Jan Karlsson, Borlänge SS
1995 – Johan Zetterberg, Mölndals ASS
1996 – Daniel Carlsson, Väsby SS
1997 – Ola Fagerstrand, Malmö KK
1998 – Daniel Carlsson, Väsby SS
1999 – Lars Frölander, Sundsvalls SS
2000 – Lars Frölander, Sundsvalls SS
2001 – Tero Välimaa, SK Neptun
2002 – Lars Frölander, Linköpings ASS
2003 – Lars Frölander, Linköpings ASS
2004 – Tero Välimaa, Väsby SS
2005 – Erik Andersson, Göteborg Sim
2006 – Lars Frölander, Linköpings ASS
2007 – Lars Frölander, Linköpings ASS

200m butterfly

1966 – Peter Feil, Eskilstuna SS
1967 – Bo Westergren, Stockholmspolisens IF
1968 – Peter Feil, Eskilstuna SS
1969 – Bo Westergren, Stockholmspolisens IF
1970 – Anders Bellbring, Upsala SS
1971 – Peter Feil, Eskilstuna SS
1972 – Peter Feil, Eskilstuna SS
1973 – Risto Kaipanen, Stockholmspolisens IF
1974 – Risto Kaipanen, Stockholmspolisens IF
1975 – Risto Kaipanen, Stockholmspolisens IF
1976 – Anders Bellbring, Simavdelningen 1902
1977 – Pär Arvidsson, Finspångs SK
1978 – Tommy Lindell, Stockholmspolisens IF
1979 – Pär Arvidsson, Finspångs SK
1980 – Thomas Lejdström, Västerås SS
1981 – Pär Arvidsson, SK Korrugal
1982 – Pär Arvidsson, SK Korrugal
1983 – Pär Arvidsson, SK Korrugal
1984 – Thomas Lejdström, Västerås SS
1985 – Thomas Lejdström, Västerås SS
1986 – Stefan Gullberg, Stockholmspolisens IF
1987 – Jan Bidrman, Malmö KK
1988 – Christer Wallin, Mölndals ASS
1989 – Christer Wallin, Mölndals ASS
1990 – Stefan Pärlklo, Stockholmspolisens IF
1991 – Mats Rasmusson, Helsingborgs SS
1992 – Gustaf Johansson, Täby Sim
1993 – Gustaf Johansson, Stockholmspolisens IF
1994 – Stefan Gullberg, Stockholmspolisens IF
1995 – Fredrik Lundin, Ystads SS
1996 – Johan Mattsson, SK Triton
1997 – Fredrik Lundin, SK Neptun
1998 – Michael Jacobsson, Täby Sim
1999 – Carl Gårdmark, Ystads SS
2000 – Tero Välimaa, SK Neptun
2001 – Tero Välimaa, SK Neptun
2002 – Tero Välimaa, SK Neptun
2003 – Johannes Nordenstam, Väsby SS
2004 – Tero Välimaa, Väsby SS
2005 – Jesper Levander, Södertörns SS
2006 – Simon Sjödin, Södertörns SS
2007 – Simon Sjödin, Södertörns SS

100m IM

1991 – Hans-Olov Nilsson, Malmö KK
1992 – Anders Holmertz, Spårvägens SF
1993 – Anders Holmertz, Spårvägens SF
1994 – Peter Haraldsson, Södertälje SS
1995 – Ola Frej, SK Neptun
1996 – Pär Gustafsson, Ängelholms SS
1997 – Johan Nyström, Sundsvalls SS
1998 – Patrik Isaksson, Västerås SS
1999 – Patrik Isaksson, Västerås SS
2000 – David Gustavsson, Norrköpings KK
2001 – Stefan Nystrand, Södertörns SS
2002 – Erik Dorch, Linköpings ASS
2003 – Erik Dorch, Linköpings ASS
2004 – Filip Lundeholm, Jönköpings SS
2005 – Erik Dorch, Linköpings ASS
2006 – Per Nylin, Norrköpings KK
2007 – Per Nylin, Norrköpings KK

200m IM

1959 – Willy Hemlin, Simavdelningen 1902
1960 – Rolf Friberg, Jönköpings SLS
1968 – Gunnar Larsson, Malmö SS
1969 – Hans Ljungberg, Malmö SS
1970 – Hans Ljungberg, Timrå AIF
1971 – Hans Ljungberg, Timrå AIF
1976 – Anders Norling, Stockholmspolisens IF
1977 – Anders Ottosson, Kristianstads SLS
1978 – Gary Andersson, Kristianstads SLS
1979 – Pär Arvidsson, Finspångs SK
1980 – Gary Andersson, Västerås SS
1981 – Bengt Baron, SK Korrugal
1982 – Per Holmertz, Stockholmspolisens IF
1983 – Mikael Örn, Kristianstads SLS
1984 – Anders Peterson, Mariestads SS
1985 – Mikael Örn, Kristianstads SLS
1986 – Anders Peterson, Mariestads SS
1987 – Jan Bidrman, Malmö KK
1988 – Jan Bidrman, Malmö KK
1989 – Jan Bidrman, Malmö KK
1990 – Jan Bidrman, Malmö KK
1991 – Anders Holmertz, Spårvägens SF
1992 – Anders Holmertz, Spårvägens SF
1993 – Daniel Karlsson, Täby Sim
1994 – Daniel Karlsson, Täby Sim
1995 – Fredrik Lundin, Ystads SS
1996 – Daniel Karlsson, Täby Sim
1997 – Michael Jacobsson, Täby Sim
1998 – Patrik Isaksson, Västerås SS
1999 – David Gustavsson, Norrköpings KK
2000 – David Gustavsson, Norrköpings KK
2001 – David Gustafsson, Norrköpings KK
2002 – Michael Jacobsson, Täby Sim
2003 – Michael Jacobsson, Täby Sim
2004 – Erik Samuelsson, Väsby SS
2005 – Erik Samuelsson, Väsby SS
2006 – Axel Pettersson, SK Neptun
2007 – Simon Sjödin, SK Neptun

400m IM

1972 – Gunnar Larsson, Malmö SS
1973 – Gunnar Larsson, Malmö SS
1975 – Bengt Gingsjö, Simavdelningen 1902
1975 – Bengt Gingsjö, Simavdelningen 1902
1976 – Mikael Nyström, SK Neptun
1977 – Pär Arvidsson, Finspångs SK
1978 – Gary Andersson, Kristianstads SLS
1979 – Thomas Lejdström, Västerås SS
1980 – Thomas Lejdström, Västerås SS
1981 – Thomas Lejdström, Västerås SS
1982 – Thomas Lejdström, Västerås SS
1983 – Thomas Lejdström, Västerås SS
1984 – Thomas Lejdström, Västerås SS
1985 – Stefan Persson, Malmö KK
1986 – Stefan Persson, Malmö KK
1987 – Jan Bidrman, Malmö KK
1988 – Jan Bidrman, Malmö KK
1989 – Jan Bidrman, Malmö KK
1990 – Jan Bidrman, Malmö KK
1991 – Björn Möller, Malmö KK
1992 – Daniel Karlsson, Täby Sim
1993 – Fredrik Lundin, Ystads SS
1994 – Daniel Karlsson, Täby Sim
1995 – Fredrik Lundin, Ystads SS
1996 – Fredrik Lundin, Ystads SS
1997 – Michael Jacobsson, Täby Sim
1998 – Michael Jacobsson, Täby Sim
1999 – Joakim Andersson, Göteborg Sim
2000 – Johan Sundqvist, Jönköpings SS
2001 – Johan Sundqvist, Malmö KK
2002 – Dan Hellström, Malmö KK
2003 – Michael Jacobsson, Täby Sim
2004 – Axel Pettersson, SK Neptun
2005 – Axel Pettersson, SK Neptun
2006 – Axel Pettersson, SK Neptun
2007 – Simon Sjödin, SK Neptun

4x50m freestyle relay

1991 – Upsala SS
1992 – Karlskrona SS
1992 – Upsala SS
1993 – Borlänge SS
1994 – Upsala SS
1995 – Upsala SS
1996 – Jönköpings SS
1997 – Upsala SS
1998 – Upsala SS
1999 – Södertälje SS (John Miranda, Patric Robertsson, Jan Helgesson, Pär Helgesson)
2000 – Södertälje SS (John Miranda, Patric Robertsson, Jan Helgesson, Pär Helgesson)
2001 – Sundsvalls SS (Johan Nyström, Daniel Lönnberg, Johan Backlund, Lars Frölander)
2002 – Linköpings ASS (Richard Piehl, Erik Dorch, Lars Frölander, Marcus Piehl)
2003 – Linköpings ASS (Marcus Piehl, Lars Frölander, Rickard Piehl, Erik Dorch)
2004 – Linköpings ASS (Marcus Piehl, Rickard Piehl, Erik Dorch, Lars Frölander)
2005 – Linköpings ASS (Marcus Piehl, Erik Dorch, Filip Lundeholm, Hans Albrektsson)
2006 – SK Neptun (Pontus Flodqvist, Stefan Nystrand, Johan Wallberg, Petter Stymne)
2007 – SK Neptun (Pontus Flodqvist, Stefan Nystrand, Petter Stymne, Peter Edvardsson)

4x100m freestyle relay

1953 – SK Poseidon
1954 – SK Poseidon
1955 – SK Poseidon
1956 – SK Poseidon
1957 – Simavdelningen 1902
1958 – SK Neptun (Per-Olof Eriksson, Lars Hennix, Bengt Nordvall, Per-Ola Lindberg)
1959 – SK Neptun (Per-Olof Eriksson, Rune Jansson, Bengt Nordvall, Per-Ola Lindberg)
1960 – SK Neptun (Per-Olof Eriksson, Leif Wolmsten, Bengt Nordvall, Per-Ola Lindberg)
1961 – SK Neptun (Per-Ola Lindberg, Per-Olof Eriksson, Lars-Erik Bengtsson, Bengt Nordvall)
1962 – SK Neptun (Per-Olof Eriksson, Leif Wolmsten, Bengt Nordvall, Lars-Erik Bengtsson)
1963 – SK Neptun
1964 – SK Neptun
1965 – SK Neptun
1966 – SK Neptun
1967 – SK Neptun
1968 – SK Neptun
1969 – Luleå SS
1970 – Stockholmspolisens IF
1971 – Timrå AIF
1976 – Simavdelningen 1902
1977 – Borlänge SS
1978 – Kristianstads SLS
1979 – Borlänge SS
1980 – Borlänge SS
1981 – Stockholmspolisens IF
1982 – Stockholmspolisens IF
1983 – Borlänge SS
1984 – Borlänge SS
1985 – Upsala SS
1986 – Upsala SS
1987 – Helsingborgs SS (Sten Williamsson, Viktor Olsson, Nils Liedberg, Tony Lennartsson)
1988 – Borlänge SS
1989 – Borlänge SS
1990 – Karlskrona SS
1991 – Upsala SS
1992 – Karlskrona SS
1993 – Jönköpings SS
1994 – Spårvägens SF
1995 – Spårvägens SF
1996 – Sundsvalls SS
1997 – Spårvägens SF
1998 – Spårvägens SF
1999 – Spårvägens SF (Fredrik Letzler, Jonas Åkesson, Jim Westman, Ola Fagerstrand)
2000 – Sundsvalls SS (Johan Nyström, Mikael E. Rosén, Lars Frölander, Johan Backlund)
2001 – Sundsvalls SS (Johan Backlund, Daniel Lönnberg, Johan Nyström, Lars Frölander)
2002 – Södertörns SS (Johan Levander, Mikael Larsson, Jesper Levander, Stefan Nystrand)
2003 – Linköpings ASS (Marcus Piehl, Lars Frölander, Erik Dorch, Rickard Piehl)
2004 – Södertörns SS (Johan Levander, Jesper Levander, Stefan Nystrand, Mikael Larsson)
2005 – Linköpings ASS (Marcus Piehl, Erik Dorch, Filip Lundeholm, Hans Albrektsson)
2006 – Linköpings ASS (Marcus Piehl, Erik Andersson, Erik Dorch, Lars Frölander)
2007 – SK Neptun (Pontus Flodqvist, Petter Stymne, Stefan Nystrand, Peter Edvardsson)

4x200m freestyle relay

1972 – Timrå AIF
1973 – SKK-Spårvägen
1974 – Simavdelningen 1902
1975 – Falu SS
1976 – Simavdelningen 1902
1977 – Borlänge SS
1978 – Upsala SS
1979 – Kristianstads SLS
1980 – Västerås SS
1981 – Västerås SS
1982 – Stockholmspolisens IF
1983 – Kristianstads SLS
1984 – Stockholmspolisens IF
1985 – Upsala SS
1986 – Motala SS (Anders Holmertz, Mikael Holmertz, Per Holmertz, Henrik Leek)
1987 – Malmö KK
1988 – Malmö KK
1989 – Upsala SS
1994 – Spårvägens SF
1995 – Spårvägens SF
1996 – Sundsvalls SS
1997 – Sundsvalls SS
1998 – Malmö KK
1999 – SK Neptun (Marcus Fahlén, Anders Forsberg, Johan Wallberg, Stefano Prestinoni)
2000 – SK Neptun (Tero Välimaa, Johan Wallberg, Anders Forsberg, Peter Edvardsson)
2001 – SK Neptun (Peter Edvardsson, Fredrik Seidevall, Stefano Prestinoni, Johan Wallberg)
2002 – Södertörns SS (Jesper Levander, Johan Levander, Stefan Nystrand, Mikael E. Rosén)
2003 – Södertörns SS (Jesper Levander, Mikael Larsson, Stefan Nystrand, Mikael E. Rosén)
2004 – Malmö KK (Hannes Kohnke, Jonas Persson, Max von Bodungen, Martin Gustavsson)
2005 – Södertörns SS (Jesper Levander, Simon Sjödin, Stefan Nystrand, Mikael E. Rosén)
2006 – Linköpings ASS (Erik Andersson, Lars Frölander, Marcus Piehl, Kristofer Johansson)
2007 – SK Neptun (Petter Stymne, Stefan Nystrand, Peter Edvardsson, Simon Sjödin)

4x50m medley relay

1994 – Södertälje SS (Marcus Lundstedt, Peter Haraldsson, Jonas Åkesson, Patric Robertsson)
1995 – Södertälje SS (Marcus Lundstedt, Patric Robertsson, Jonas Åkesson, Anders Bladh)
1996 – Sundsvalls SS
1997 – Spårvägens SF
1998 – Spårvägens SF
1999 – Väsby SS (Daniel Carlsson, Erik Brannestål, Jan Karlsson, Anders Jönsson)
2000 – Malmö KK (Fredrik Engdahl, Martin Gustavsson, Andreas Lentonsson, Niklas Svensson)
2001 – Sundsvalls SS (Daniel Lönnberg, Jens Johansson, Lars Frölander, Johan Nyström)
2002 – SK Neptun (Peter Segerlund, Andreas Eriksson, Tero Välimaa, Johan Norling)
2003 – Linköpings ASS (Richard Piehl, Jakob Dorch, Lars Frölander, Marcus Piehl)
2004 – Linköpings ASS (Rickard Piehl, Jakob Dorch, Erik Dorch, Marcus Piehl)
2005 – Linköpings ASS (Marcus Piehl, Jakob Dorch, Filip Lundeholm, Erik Dorch)
2006 – Linköpings ASS (Marcus Piehl, Jakob Dorch, Lars Frölander, Erik Dorch)
2007 – SK Neptun (Simon Sjödin, Christer Tour, Stefan Nystrand, Petter Stymne)

4x100m medley relay

1968 – Sundsvalls SS
1969 – Stockholmspolisens IF
1970 – Simavdelningen 1902
1971 – Timrå AIF
1972 – Timrå AIF
1973 – SKK-Spårvägen
1974 – Simavdelningen 1902
1975 – Simavdelningen 1902
1976 – Stockholmspolisens IF
1977 – Stockholmspolisens IF
1978 – Stockholmspolisens IF
1979 – Finspångs SK (Bengt Baron, Björn Larsson, Pär Arvidsson, Freddy Heinefeldt)
1980 – Kristianstads SLS
1981 – SK Korrugal (Bengt Baron, Tommy Pettersson, Pär Arvidsson, Anders Nordström)
1982 – Stockholmspolisens IF
1983 – SK Korrugal (Bengt Baron, Tommy Pettersson, Pär Arvidsson, Anders Nordström)
1984 – SK Korrugal (Bengt Baron, Tommy Pettersson, Pär Arvidsson, Anders Nordström)
1985 – Upsala SS
1986 – Örebro SA
1987 – Helsingborgs SS (Nils Liedberg, Per-Ola Lundbladh, Anders Rasmusson, Viktor Olsson)
1988 – Stockholmspolisens IF
1989 – Stockholmspolisens IF
1990 – Stockholmspolisens IF
1991 – Upsala SS
1992 – Karlskrona SS
1993 – Södertälje SS (Marcus Lundstedt, Peter Haraldsson, Jonas Åkesson, Patric Robertsson)
1994 – Spårvägens SF
1995 – Växjö SS
1996 – Sundsvalls SS
1997 – Sundsvalls SS
1998 – Spårvägens SF
1999 – Sundsvalls SS (Niklas Åhlin, Jens Johansson, Lars Frölander, Johan Nyström)
2000 – Sundsvalls SS (Daniel Lönnberg, Johan Nyström, Lars Frölander, Johan Backlund)
2001 – Sundsvalls SS (Daniel Lönnberg, Jens Johansson, Lars Frölander, Johan Backlund)
2002 – SK Neptun (Peter Segerlund, Andreas Eriksson, Tero Välimaa, Marcus Andersson)
2003 – Linköpings ASS (Richard Piehl, Jakob Dorch, Lars Frölander, Marcus Piehl)
2004 – Malmö KK (Sten-Olof Gustafsson, Martin Gustavsson, Andreas Lentonsson, Jonas Persson)
2005 – Linköpings ASS (Marcus Piehl, Jakob Dorch, Filip Lundeholm, Erik Dorch)
2006 – Linköpings ASS (Erik Andersson, Jakob Dorch, Lars Frölander, Marcus Piehl)
2007 – SK Neptun (Simon Sjödin, Christer Tour, Stefan Nystrand, Petter Stymne)

Discontinued events

800m freestyle

1956 – Willy Hemlin, Simavdelningen 1902
1957 – Willy Hemlin, Simavdelningen 1902
1958 – Willy Hemlin, Simavdelningen 1902
1959 – Lars-Erik Bengtsson, SK Neptun
1960 – Jan Andersson, IK Attack
1961 – Sten Ekman, Tunafors SK
1962 – Hans Rosendahl, Katrineholms SS
1963 – Jan Lundin, Stockholmspolisens IF
1964 – Ingvar Eriksson, Sundsvalls SS
1965 – Ingvar Eriksson, Sundsvalls SS
1966 – Lester Eriksson, SK Neptun
1967 – Lester Eriksson, SK Neptun
1968 – Gunnar Larsson, Malmö SS
1969 – Gunnar Larsson, Malmö SS
1971 – Sven von Holst, Stockholms KK
1970 – Anders Bellbring, Upsala SS

4x100m backstroke

1961 – Skellefteå-Rönnskärs SK (G Bergengren, T Born, Bengt Furberg, Peter Bergengren)
1962 – Skellefteå-Rönnskärs SK
1963 – Stockholmspolisens IF
1964 – SK Neptun
1965 – Stockholmspolisens IF
1966 – Sundsvalls SS
1967 – Stockholmspolisens IF

4x100m breaststroke

1961 – Stockholmspolisens IF (Tommie Lindström, H Bolkéus, J Lindström, L Fröstad)
1962 – Stockholmspolisens IF (R Svensson, J Lindström, L Fröstad, Tommie Lindström)
1963 – SK Ran
1964 – SK Ran
1965 – SK Ran
1966 – Stockholmspolisens IF
1967 – Stockholmspolisens IF

4x100m butterfly

1961 – Stockholmspolisens IF (B Larsson, J Lindhroth, Jan Lundin, Håkan Bengtsson)
1962 – Stockholmspolisens IF
1963 – Stockholmspolisens IF
1964 – Stockholmspolisens IF
1965 – Stockholmspolisens IF
1966 – Simavdelningen 1902
1967 – Stockholmspolisens IF

References
Alm, B. (2004). Historiska simtag: Svensk simidrott under hundra år, Solna: Svenska Simförbundet

Swedish Short Course Swimming Championships
Short Course Swimming Championships champions